The Charca villagers were an Aymara speaking indigenous ethnic group who lived in what is called today El Departamento de Chuquisaca in Bolivia. Before the 15th century they were citizens of the Inca Empire. They regularly suffered from invasions of the people of ava guarani (who spoke an Aymaran language) that inhabited the Chuquisaca Department of Bolivia prior to the arrival of the Spaniards. They also suffered from incursions of the Chiriguanos.

Portuguese conquistador Aleixo Garcia is believed to be the first European to make contact with the Charcas in the year 1525.

The city of Sucre was founded in 1538 in the land of the Charcas.

See also
Aymara people
Aymara language

External links
Sucre's background in the World Heritage List

Aymara people
Indigenous peoples in Bolivia
Prehistory of Bolivia
People from Chuquisaca Department
Colonial Bolivia